Dōngmén may refer to:

 Dongmen (surname), a Chinese compound surname

Locations in China 
 Dongmen, Shenzhen, in Luohu District, Shenzhen, Guangdong
 Dongmen, Fusui County, a town in Guangxi
 Dongmen, Luocheng County, a town in Luocheng Mulao Autonomous County, Guangxi
 Dongmen, Wenquan, a village in Yingshan County, Hubei
 Dongmen, Xinghua, a former village in Xinghua Township, Hong'an County, Hubei
 Dongmen Subdistrict, Guixi, in Guixi, Jianxi
 Dongmen Subdistrict (disambiguation)
 Dongmen Township, Dao County, Hunan
 Dongmen Reef, Sansha, Hainan